Neza in Iran may refer to:

 Neza-e Kuchek
 Neza-e Olya